The Monarchist Democratic Party (PDM) was a Spanish political party led by José Canalejas which split from the Liberal Party in 1902. In 1910, Canalejas returned to lead the PL, with the PDM being subsequently dissolved.

See also
Liberalism and radicalism in Spain

References

Liberal Party (Spain, 1880)
Defunct political parties in Spain
Political parties established in 1902
Political parties disestablished in 1910
1902 establishments in Spain
1910 disestablishments in Spain
Restoration (Spain)